Ghatothkach is a 2008 Indian animated film based on the life of the Mahabharata character Ghatotkacha, the son of Bhima and Hidimba. The film is written and directed by Singeetam Srinivasa Rao, who also scored the soundtrack. The film was premiered at the 2008 Cannes Film Festival in the International Critics' Week, and was also premiered to special mention at the Grand Finale - Children's Film Festival 2014 of the 44th International Film Festival of India.

It was followed by a direct-to-video sequel, Ghatothkach 2, in 2013. Directed by Vijay S. Bhanushali and Smita Maroo it further follows the adventures of the child Ghatotkacha.

See also
List of indian animated feature films

References

2008 films
2008 animated films
Indian animated fantasy films
Hindu mythological films
Animated comedy films
Animated feature films
Animated musical films
Animated films about elephants
Films about wish fulfillment
Films based on fairy tales
Films set in Asia
Genies in film
Indian musical fantasy films
Films directed by Singeetam Srinivasa Rao
Animated films based on Mahabharata
Indian children's films
2000s children's animated films
Hindu mythology in popular culture
Indian mythology in popular culture
2000s English-language films